The 2003 Canadian Figure Skating Championships took place between January 6–12, 2003 in Saskatoon, Saskatchewan. It is a figure skating national championship held annually to determine the national champions of Canada and is organized by Skate Canada, the nation's figure skating governing body. Skaters competed in the disciplines of men's singles, ladies' singles, pair skating, and ice dancing on the senior and junior levels. Due to the large number of competitors, the senior men's and senior ladies' qualifying were split into two groups. Aside from determining the national champions, the event also served to help choose the Canadian teams to the 2003 World Championships, the 2003 Four Continents Championships, and the 2003 World Junior Championships.

Senior results

Men

Ladies

Pairs

Ice dancing

Junior results

Men

Ladies

Pairs

Ice dancing

External links
 2003 Canadian Championships

Canadian Figure Skating Championships
Canadian Figure Skating Championships
Figure Skating Championships
Canadian Figure Skating Championships
Canadian Figure Skating Championships